Colucci is a surname, and may refer to;

 Giuseppe Colucci (antiquarian) - Italian historian
 Leonardo Colucci - Italian retired footballer and coach
 Jill Colucci - American songwriter and vocalist
 Reinaldo Colucci - Brazilian triathlete
 Ryan Colucci - American feature film producer, writer and comic book creator
 Coluche born Michel Gérard Joseph Colucci - French comedian and actor
 Patrick Colucci - American novelist and poet 
 Mia Colucci (disambiguation), characters in the telenovela Rebelde Way
 Vincenzo Colucci - Neapolitan artist of seaside scenes; 20th century
 Vincenzo Colucci - Italian professor of veterinary science in latter part of the 19th century; best known for work on salamander eye, limb, and tail regeneration. Biography included in Holland (2021).

References

Surnames of Italian origin
Italian-language surnames